Carl Vinnen (28 August 1863, Bremen - 16 April 1922, Munich) was a German landscape painter. He was also a writer, on various topics of local interest, under the pseudonym "Johann Heinrich Fischbeck".

Life and work 
He was born to Johann Christoph Vinnen (1829-1912), a shipping company owner, and his wife, Jenny Friederike née Westenfeld, who died when Carl was only seven. His younger brother, also went into the shipping business and became a politician. After finishing school, he worked for his father's company. At the age of twenty-three, he began his studies at the Kunstakademie Düsseldorf, with Heinrich Lauenstein and Hugo Crola. He also took private lessons from Eugen Dücker. In 1888, he continued his studies in Karlsruhe. He was heavily influenced by the works of Arnold Böcklin, and focused on painting melancholy landscapes.

Although he never actually lived there, he came to be perceived as a member, and helped create the "Künstlervereinigung Worpswede" (artist's association), to promote their works; an enterprise for which his earlier commercial training proved useful. A joint exhibition by the Colony and the Munich Secession, at the Glasplast in 1895, received critical praise.

He maintained a studio at the family estate in Osterndorf. In winter, he painted from a portable, heated studio. Thanks to his family's wealth, he could afford to travel often; not only throughout Europe, but to Asia and Africa as well. In 1902, when the poet, Rainer Maria Rilke, wrote a book about the Worpswede Colony, Vinnen declined to be included. That same year, he became engaged, to Anna Lagemann, but the wedding did not take place until many years later. In 1903, he was awarded a small gold medal at the Große Berliner Kunstausstellung. Shortly after, he became a member of the Deutscher Künstlerbund.

In his later years, he moved away from his association with Worpswede. In 1908, he physically moved, from Osterndorf to Cuxhaven, where he focused on maritime motifs. In 1911, he led a protest against the growing influence of French art; occasioned by the acquisition of Van Gogh's Poppy Field, by the Kunsthalle Bremen; under the direction of Gustav Pauli. He published several manifestos on the subject. 

At the beginning of World War I, he moved to Munich, where he had a second home. After the war, in 1919, he finally married his longtime fiancée, Anna. Within a few months, he suffered a stroke. He died of a second stroke in 1922, and was interred at his family's private cemetery in Osterndorf.

References

Further reading 
 Hans Wohltmann: "Vinnen, Carl", in: Otto Heinrich May (Ed.): Niedersächsische Lebensbilder, Vol. 5, 1962, pg.305
 Almuth Sayk zu Jeddeloh: Carl Vinnen. (exhibition catalog) Barkenhoff Worpswede, Worpsweder Verlag, Lilienthal, 1995 
 Im Kampf um die Kunst: die Antwort auf den Protest deutscher Künstler, R. Piper, München 1911 (Online @ UB Heidelberg, Online @ Archive.org)
 "Vinnen, Carl", In: Allgemeines Lexikon der Bildenden Künstler von der Antike bis zur Gegenwart, Vol. 34: Urliens–Vzal, E. A. Seemann, Leipzig 1940

External links 

 More works by Vinnen @ ArtNet
 
 Profile and notes @ Artfacts

1863 births
1922 deaths
German painters
German landscape painters
Kunstakademie Düsseldorf alumni
Worpswede
Artists from Bremen